Map of places in Denbighshire compiled from this list
See the list of places in Wales for places in other principal areas.

This is a list of towns and villages in the principal area of Denbighshire, Wales.

 

A
Aberwheeler

B
Berwyn, Denbighshire
Betws Gwerfil Goch
Bodelwyddan
Bodfari
Bontuchel
Bryneglwys
Bylchau

C
Carrog
Castell, Denbighshire
Cefnmeriadog
Cerrigydrudion
Chirk
Clocaenog
Corwen
Crogen
Cwm, Denbighshire
Cyffylliog
Cynwyd

D
Denbigh
Derwyn
Druid, Denbighshire
Dyserth

E
Efenechtyd

F

G
Garth, Denbighshire
Gellifor
Gellioedd
Glasfryn
Glyndyfrdwy
Gronant
Gwaenysgor
Gwyddelwern

H
Henllan
Hirwaen

I

J

K

L
Llanarmon-yn-Iâl
Llanbedr-Dyffryn-Clwyd
Llandegla
Llandrillo
Llandyrnog
Llannefydd
Llanelidan
Llanferres
Llanfwrog
Llangollen
Llangwyfan
Llangyhafal
Llanrhaeadr-yng-Nghinmeirch
Llanychan
Llanynys
Llwynmawr

M
Maerdy, Denbighshire
Maeshafn
Meliden

N
Nantglyn

O

P
Prestatyn
Prion
Pentrecelyn
Peniel

Q

R
Rhewl (on the River Clywedog)
Rhewl (on the River Dee)
Rhewl (near the Nant Mawr)
Rhuallt
Rhuddlan
Rhyl
Ruthin

S
Saron
St. Asaph

T
Tafarn Y Gelyn
Trefnant
Trelawnyd
Tremeirchion

U

V

W

X

Y

Z

See also
List of places in Denbighshire (categorised)
List of places in Wales

Denbighshire